Elizabeth Van Lew (October 12, 1818 – September 25, 1900) was an American abolitionist and philanthropist who built and operated an extensive spy ring for the Union Army during the American Civil War.  Many false claims continue to be made about her life.  The single most reliable source is a 2002 biography by University of Virginia Professor Elizabeth R. Varon.

Early life
Elizabeth Van Lew was born on October 12, 1818, in Richmond, Virginia to John Van Lew and Eliza Baker, whose maternal grandfather was Hilary Baker, mayor of Philadelphia from 1796 to 1798. Elizabeth's father came to Richmond in 1806, at the age of 16; within 20 years, he had built up a prosperous hardware business and owned several slaves.

Her family sent Van Lew to Philadelphia to be educated. The Quaker school she attended is thought to have been influential in forming her anti-slavery views. Following her father's death in 1843, Van Lew and her mother continued to live in the family's home in Richmond. John Van Lew's will stipulated that none of the family's enslaved human property could be freed. However, Elizabeth and her mother helped the slaves in their household to earn wages and a measure of freedom. While the Van Lew family benefited from slavery, she believed it would eventually fade away. Her hope was that Southerners would free their slaves and that emancipation by manumission would gradually end the practice that she viewed as abhorrent and destructive to the South.

American Civil War
Upon the outbreak of the war, Van Lew began working on behalf of the Union with her mother, caring for wounded soldiers. When Libby Prison was opened in Richmond, Van Lew was allowed to bring food, clothing, writing paper, and other things to the Union soldiers imprisoned there. She aided prisoners in escape attempts, passing them information about safe houses and getting a Union sympathizer appointed to the prison staff. Van Lew reportedly helped Union soldiers by giving them money to bribe Confederates.

Recently captured prisoners gave Van Lew information on Confederate troop levels and movements, which she was able to pass on to Union commanders. She is rumored to have helped hide escaped Union prisoners and Confederate deserters in her own mansion, although no definite proof of such claims has been found.

Van Lew also operated a spy ring during the war, which included clerks in the War and Navy Departments of the Confederacy, as well as free and enslaved African Americans, including Mary Richards Bowser. Mary Jane Richards, aka Mary Elizabeth Bowser, was reputedly a formerly enslaved maid in the Van Lew household, and was sent by the family to be educated in a Quaker school in Pennsylvania. She might have used the alias Mary Elizabeth Bowser to conceal her identity. Stories surfaced about the woman having possibly served as a maid for Jefferson Davis, while spying for the Union. She herself admitted to having served as a detective during the war.

Van Lew's spy network was so efficient that on several occasions she sent Lt. Gen. Ulysses S Grant fresh flowers from her garden and a copy of the Richmond newspaper. She developed a cipher system and often smuggled messages out of Richmond in hollow eggs. Union commanders highly valued Van Lew's work; intelligence commander George H. Sharpe, Army of the Potomac, recommended that the government reimburse Van Lew $15,000 because of the great expense she incurred in her efforts, including employment of spies. Because of the merit of her work, General Grant appointed Van Lew Postmaster General of Richmond for the next eight years.

In 1864, Van Lew risked her entire spy network to see that the corpse of Union Col. Ulric Dahlgren, who died trying to free Union prisoners in Richmond, was properly buried. Reports of disrespectful display of his corpse had outraged Northern public opinion, and Van Lew herself. Furthermore, after the long siege of Petersburg, Van Lew assisted civilians of both sides.

Postwar life
When Richmond fell to U.S. forces in April 1865, Van Lew was the first person to raise the United States flag in the city.

On Grant's first visit to Richmond after the war, he had tea with Van Lew, and later appointed her postmaster of Richmond. Van Lew modernized the city's postal system and employed several African-Americans, with the same pay and benefits as white employees, until new President Rutherford B. Hayes had her replaced in 1877. She was allowed to return as a postal clerk in Richmond, where she served from 1883 to 1887.

After Reconstruction, Van Lew became increasingly ostracized in Richmond.  "No one will walk with us on the street," she wrote, "no one will go with us anywhere; and it grows worse and worse as the years roll on." Having spent her family's fortune on intelligence activities during the war, she tried in vain to be reimbursed by the federal government. When attempts to secure a government pension also failed, she received support from the family and friends of Union Col. Paul Joseph Revere, whom she had helped while he was held prisoner during the Civil War. These Bostonians gladly collected money for the woman who helped so many Union soldiers during the war. However, neighborhood children, including future novelist Ellen Glasgow, were told to consider her a witch. Even into the twentieth century, many white Southerners regarded Van Lew as a traitor. However, among Richmonders of color and white Unionists, at least, Van Lew was an honored figure.

Death and legacy

Van Lew died on September 25, 1900 (aged 81), and was buried in Richmond's Shockoe Hill Cemetery in the same grave as her beloved niece Eliza Van Lew, who had been her constant companion in her later years, and who had died just a few months before her. Elizabeth was purportedly buried vertically, facing the north; however, this is highly unlikely, as Cemetery records do not reflect that circumstance, and such a burial would have been unnecessary as multiple persons were often buried in a common grave shaft in that era. Relatives of Union Colonel Paul J. Revere, whom she had aided during the war, donated the tombstone. The epitaph reads: "ELIZABETH L. VAN LEW (1818 - 1900) She risked everything that is dear to man-- friends-- fortune-- comfort-- health-- life itself-- that slavery might be abolished and the Union preserved. This boulder from the Capitol Hill in Boston is a tribute from Massachusetts friends." In her will, Van Lew bequeathed her personal manuscripts, including her account of the war, to John P. Reynolds, Col. Revere's nephew. In 1911 Reynolds was able to convince the scholar William G. Beymer to publish the first biography of Van Lew in Harper's Monthly. The biography indicated that Van Lew had been so successful in her spying activities because she had feigned lunacy, and this idea won Van Lew the nickname "Crazy Bet". However, it is highly unlikely that Van Lew actually did pretend to be crazy. Instead, she probably would have relied on the Victorian custom of female charity to cover her espionage.

The city of Richmond acquired and demolished the Van Lew mansion, her former home, in 1911. Bellevue Elementary School (which still remains) was erected on the site the following year. Historical plaques and a marker now memorialize her activities, and those of Bowser (a/k/a Mary Jane Richards). Furthermore, the daughter of two of Van Lew's servants, Maggie Walker, became a prominent Christian entrepreneur in Richmond, founding the country's first African-American-woman owned bank.

Elizabeth Van Lew was inducted into the Military Intelligence Hall of Fame in 1993.

Books and films 
Elizabeth Van Lew was an insignificant character in the 1944 book Yankee Stranger by Elswyth Thane, the second in her Williamsburg series, and a character in The Secrets of Mary Bowser, a novel by Lois Leveen. Her story was also fictionalized in 1995 children's book The Secret of the Lion's Head by Beverly Hall, the 2005 novel Elizabeth Van Lew: Civil War Spy by Heidi Schoof, the 2006 novel Only Call Us Faithful: A Novel of the Union Underground by Marie Jakober, the 2013 novel The Spymistress by Jennifer Chiaverini. and the 2016 novel "Crazy Bet and the Gentleman from Massachusetts" by Frederick Lapisardi.

The 1987 television movie A Special Friendship tells a fictionalized story of the friendship and pro-Union collaboration of Van Lew (who is presented as a young, rather than middle-aged, woman in the film) and her former slave Mary Bowser. The 1990 television movie Traitor in My House tells the story of Elizabeth Van Lew from the perspective of her niece; Mary Kay Place portrays Elizabeth.

A fictionalized, but heavily researched account of Elizabeth Van Lew's work during the Civil War is included in Karen Abbott's 2015 novel, Liar, Temptress, Soldier, Spy: Four Women Undercover in the Civil War.

References

Further reading

 Casstevens, Frances Harding. Tales from the North and the South: Twenty-Four Remarkable People and Events of the Civil War. Jefferson, N.C.: McFarland & Co, 2007.  
 Downing, David C. A South Divided: Portraits of Dissent in the Confederacy. Nashville: Cumberland House, 2007. 
 Furgurson, Ernest B. Ashes of Glory: Richmond at War. New York: A.A. Knopf, 1996.  
 Jakober, Marie.  Only Call Us Faithful: A Novel of the Union Underground. New York: Tom Doherty Associates, 2002. 
 Kane, Harnett T. Spies for the Blue and Gray. Garden City, N.Y.: Hanover House, 1954.  
 Ryan, David D. A Yankee Spy in Richmond: The Civil War Diary of "Crazy Bet" Van Lew.  Mechanicsburg, PA: Stackpole Books, 1996. 
 Tsui, Bonnie. She Went to the Field: Women Soldiers of the Civil War. Guilford, CT: TwoDot, 2006.  
 Varon, Elizabeth. Southern Lady, Yankee Spy: The True Story of Elizabeth Van Lew, A Union Agent in the Heart of the Confederacy. New York: Oxford University Press, 2003. 

1818 births
1900 deaths
People from Richmond, Virginia
American Civil War spies
Female wartime spies
Women in the American Civil War
Southern Unionists in the American Civil War
Underground Railroad people